The Avon Aqueduct is a navigable aqueduct that carries the Union Canal over the River Avon, near Linlithgow, Scotland.

History

The aqueduct was built to a design by Hugh Baird, with advice from Thomas Telford, in tandem with the aqueducts at Slateford and Lin's Mill, with which it shares its design. Telford was not convinced that the stone arches were necessary in conjunction with the iron trough, but Baird used both on all three major aqueducts. Construction was carried out by Messrs. Craven, Whitaker and Nowell between 1819 and 1821, their success in building a stone bridge over the River Ouse making their tender for the contract "by far the most eligible".

The aqueduct straddles the border between the West Lothian and Falkirk Council areas, so has two Historic Environment Scotland listings. The aqueduct is a category A listed building.

Design

The Barton Aqueduct of 1761, and subsequent canal aqueducts in the United Kingdom, used large quantities of masonry and puddling to obtain watertightness. After the success of The Iron Bridge in 1789, however, cast iron was used by Telford on aqueducts such as Chirk and Pontcysyllte. Aqueducts built in the early part of the 19th century use either puddle clay or an iron trough in no particular pattern. The Avon Aqueduct uses an iron trough to achieve watertightness, as well as containing the outward pressure of the water, allowing it to be of more slender construction than a purely stone aqueduct such as the Kelvin Aqueduct.

The aqueduct is carried on twelve segmental arches, each of  span.

It is the longest and tallest aqueduct in Scotland, and the second longest in Britain, after the Pontcysyllte Aqueduct in Wales.

The river passes under the aqueduct at the eastern end, where the aqueduct has a slight curve. It can be viewed from Muiravonside Country Park.

See also
List of canal aqueducts in Great Britain
List of Category A listed buildings in Falkirk
 List of listed buildings in Muiravonside, Falkirk

References

External links

Buildings and structures in West Lothian
Transport in Falkirk (council area)
Transport in West Lothian
Category A listed buildings in Falkirk (council area)
Listed bridges in Scotland
Category A listed buildings in West Lothian
Bridges by Thomas Telford
Navigable aqueducts in Scotland
Cast iron aqueducts